Walter Scott Forsyth (May 4, 1892 – December 19, 1966) was a professional football coach for the Rochester Jeffersons of the American Professional Football Association (renamed the National Football League in 1922). He coached the team from 1919 until 1921. He was the Jeffs first head coach in the NFL.

Head coaching record

References

1890s births
1966 deaths
Rochester Jeffersons coaches
Place of death missing
Sportspeople from Rochester, New York